Stream tree frog may refer to:

 Mountain stream tree frog (Litoria barringtonensis), a frog in the family Hylidae native to New South Wales, Australia
 Prince Charles stream tree frog (Hyloscirtus princecharlesi), a frog in the family Hylidae found in Ecuador

Animal common name disambiguation pages